Henry R. Luscher was a Mobile, Alabama-area community leader and politician who served two terms as the city's Public Safety Commissioner and several stints as the city's Mayor. All of his terms as Mayor of Mobile were when the title was co-extensive with the presidency of the City Commission. He was defeated for re-election in 1961 by challenger George E. McNally, the first open Republican elected to office in Mobile since Reconstruction. Luscher had also served as King of the Mobile Carnival Association during his youth.

References

World Statesmen list of Mayors of Mobile

Year of birth unknown
Mayors of Mobile, Alabama